A garage is a covered structure built for the purpose of parking, storing, protecting, maintaining, and/or repairing vehicles. Specific applications include:

Garage (residential), a building or part of a building for storing one or more vehicles
Automobile repair shop, also called a garage, where vehicles are serviced and repaired
Bus garage, a building or complex used for storage of buses when not in use
Filling station, an automotive service station where vehicles take on fuel or recharge
Multistorey car park, or parking garage, a building serving as a public parking facility

Other meanings of garage may include:

Arts, entertainment, and media

Films
Garage (film), a 2007 film by Lenny Abrahamson
The Garage (1920 film), a film by Roscoe Arbuckle
The Garage (1980 film), a film by Eldar Ryazanov

Video game 
Garage (video game), a 1999 Japanese horror adventure video game

Music

Groups and genres
 Garage (band), a Czech rock band
 Garage house, a form of dance music that emerged in the 1980s
 UK garage (also known as simply "garage"), a form of dance music that emerged in the 1990s
 Garage rock, a form of rock and roll that emerged in the 1960s

Albums
 Garage (album), a 2005 album by Cross Canadian Ragweed
Garage Inc., a 1998 compilation of cover songs by Metallica

Periodicals
 Garage (fanzine), a 1980s music fanzine from New Zealand
 Garage Magazine, a biannual publication dedicated to contemporary art and fashion

Brands and enterprises
 Garage (clothing retailer), a US/Canadian retailer for teenage girls
 Garage (drink), a Finnish alcopop drink
 Garage Museum of Contemporary Art, Moscow
 Paradise Garage, also known as "the Garage" or the "Gay-rage", a now-defunct New York City discotheque located in a parking garage

See also
GarageBand, a music production software application published by Apple Computer

Disambiguation pages to be converted to broad concept articles